The Louisiana Stakes is a Grade III American Thoroughbred horse race for horses aged four years and older over a distance  miles on the dirt track held annually during the third week of January at Fair Grounds Race Course in New Orleans, Louisiana.

History
Inaugurated on December 12, 1942, the first running of the Louisiana Handicap was won by Calumet Farm's 1941 U.S. Triple Crown winner Whirlaway. It would be the last race of Whirlaway's brilliant career and he was voted his second straight American Horse of the Year title. 

Since inception, the Louisiana Handicap has been run at two different distances:
  miles  : 1947, 1952–present
  miles : 1942–1943, 1945–1946, 1949–1951

The event was not held in 1944, 1948, 2005 and 2006.

The event was renamed to the Louisiana Stakes in 2016.

In 2020 the event was upgraded to Grade III.

Records
Speed record: (at current distance of  miles)
 1:42.40 -  Soy Numero Uno (1977)

Most wins:
 3 - Tenacious (1958, 1959, 1960)

Winners

Earlier winners

1955 - Epic King
1954 - Roedna
1953 - Spur On
1952 - Light Broom
1951 - Thelma Berger
1950 - Roseborough
1949 - Grand Entry
1947 - Dockstader
1946 - Flareback
1945 - South Dakota
1943 - First Fiddle
1942 - Whirlaway

Notes

References

See also
List of American and Canadian Graded races
 The 2009 Louisiana Handicap at ESPN

Fair Grounds Race Course
Flat horse races for four-year-olds
Horse races in New Orleans
Horse racing
Open mile category horse races
Recurring sporting events established in 1942
1942 establishments in Louisiana
Grade 3 stakes races in the United States